131st meridian may refer to:

131st meridian east, a line of longitude east of the Greenwich Meridian
131st meridian west, a line of longitude west of the Greenwich Meridian